Linda Faye Clark Bullock (born 1950) is an American professor of nursing.

Education 
Bullock received a bachelor's and master's degree in nursing from Texas Woman's University. She completed a doctor of philosophy in public health at University of Otago.

Career 
Bullock was involved with Prof Judith McFarlane and Prof Barbara Parker with investigating the approach of physical abuse during pregnancy. Bullock showed that low birth weights were associated with abuse. Together they created tools that are used by researchers who are investigating abuse during pregnancy.

Bullock was the first nurse faculty member at Christchurch School of Medicine. She joined the faculty at University of Missouri Sinclair School of Nursing in 1997. She became a nursing professor in 2003. In January 2010, she was appointed as the director of the doctor of philosophy in nursing. In 2010, she joined the faculty at University of Virginia School of Nursing as the first Jeanette Lancaster Alumni Professor of Nursing, a funded chair.

Awards and honors 
Bullock is a Fellow of the American Academy of Nursing.

References

External links 

 

Living people
Fellows of the American Academy of Nursing
Texas Woman's University alumni
University of Otago alumni
Academic staff of the University of Otago
University of Missouri faculty
University of Virginia faculty
1950 births